The Human Olfactory Data Explorer (HORDE) is a database of human olfactory receptors. The database provides information of the human olfactory receptor families, as well for dogs, platypuses, opossums and chimpanzees.  The database is hosted at the Weizmann Institute of Science.

References

External links 
 HORDE home page 

Biological databases